Love Is may refer to:

 Love Is..., a comic strip
 Love Is (record label), a Thai record label
 Love is... (film), a Filipino television film headlined by Alden Richards and Maine Mendoza
Love Is (TV series), a 2018 TV series broadcast on the OWN Network

Albums 
 Love Is (The Animals album), 1968
 Love Is... (Jennylyn Mercado album), 2010
 Love Is (Kevin Sharp album), 1998
 Love Is (Kim Wilde album), 1992
 Love Is (Ruben Studdard album), 2009
 Love Is… (Sachi Tainaka album), 2008
 Love Is... (Toni Gonzaga album), 2008
 Love Is (MiChi EP), 2010
 Love Is..., a 2000 album by Sammi Cheng

Songs 
 "Love Is..." (song), a 1994 song by King Missile
 "Love Is...", a song by The Beautiful South from Welcome to the Beautiful South (1989)
 "Love Is" (Vanessa Williams and Brian McKnight song), 1993
 "Love Is" (Vikki Watson song), 1985
 "Love Is" (Alannah Myles song), a 1989 song by Alannah Myles from Alannah Myles
 "Love Is (The Hardest Part)", 1986 single by South African band Mango Groove
 "Love Is", a song by the Backstreet Boys from Never Gone
 "Love Is", a song by the Brothers Johnson from Right on Time
 "Love Is", a song by Katrina Elam
 "Love Is", a song by R. Kelly, featuring K. Michelle, from Love Letter (2010)
 "Love Is", a song by R. Kelly from Write Me Back (2012)
 "Love Is", a song by Ringo Starr from Liverpool 8
 "Love Is" (McGarrigle song), a song by Kate & Anna McGarrigle from Heartbeats Accelerating (1990)
 "Love is," a song by Stevie Nicks from Trouble in Shangri-La (2001)